Aleksandar Georgiev (born 10 October 1997) is a Bulgarian footballer who plays as a winger for Arda Kardzhali.

Career

Early career
Georgiev was a youth player of hometown team Svetkavitsa Targovishte. He spent one year in Hristo Stoichkov's academy in Vilafranca football club. After that he joined Litex Lovech's academy.

Litex Lovech
Georgiev made his debut coming on as a substitute in the 42nd minute for Litex in a match against Ludogorets Razgrad won by Litex.

CSKA Sofia
On 10 June he and 15 others Litex players joined the refounded CSKA Sofia club. He began the season in the reserve team of the club, which plays in the Bulgarian Second League. He made his debut for the first team on 18 September 2016 against Cherno More Varna coming on as a substitute in the 73rd minute.

International career
On 13 May 2016 he was included in the Bulgaria U21 team for the 2016 Toulon Tournament. He scored his first goal for the U21 side on 11 October 2016 in a match against Romania U21 won by Bulgaria with 2-0.

Career statistics

Club

References

External links

1997 births
Living people
Bulgarian footballers
Association football midfielders
PFC Litex Lovech players
PFC CSKA Sofia players
FC Septemvri Sofia players
SFC Etar Veliko Tarnovo players
FC Arda Kardzhali players
First Professional Football League (Bulgaria) players
Bulgaria youth international footballers
People from Targovishte